Monistrol de Montserrat is a municipality in the comarca of the Bages in Catalonia, Spain. The municipality includes the southern two-thirds of the massif of Montserrat and the famous Benedictine monastery of the same name. The town, known as Montserrat-Vila, is situated on the eastern flank of the massif above the valley of the Llobregat river: it is connected with the monastery (higher up) and with the railway station in the valley (FGC line R5) by the Montserrat Rack Railway (Cremallera de Montserrat). The C-1411 road links the town with Martorell and Manresa. The bridge over the Llobregat river dates from the fourteenth century. The municipality includes a small exclave to the north-west.

Demography

References

 Panareda Clopés, Josep Maria; Rios Calvet, Jaume; Rabella Vives, Josep Maria (1989). Guia de Catalunya, Barcelona: Caixa de Catalunya.  (Spanish).  (Catalan).

External links 

  
 Government data pages 

Municipalities in Bages